Shivaji Yadav (born 6 September 1976) is an Indian former cricketer. He played 33 first-class matches for Hyderabad between 1995 and 2004. Yadav later became a junior selector for the Hyderabad Cricket Association, before leading the selection committee.

See also
 List of Hyderabad cricketers

References

External links
 

1976 births
Living people
Indian cricketers
Hyderabad cricketers
Cricketers from Hyderabad, India